Two Gallants could refer to either:
 Two Gallants (story), a short story by James Joyce
 Two Gallants (band), a rock band
 Two Gallants (album), the self-titled album by Two Gallants